The 30th Golden Melody Awards (Chinese: 第30屆金曲獎) took place in Taipei, Taiwan in 2019. The award ceremony for the popular music categories was hosted by Lulu and broadcast on TTV on 29 June.

Winners and nominees 
Below is the list of winners and nominees for the popular music categories.

References

External links 
 

Golden Melody Awards
Golden Melody Awards
Golden Melody Awards
Golden Melody Awards